Colin Nish (born 14 December 1955) is a former Australian rules footballer who played for Geelong in the Victorian Football League (now known as the Australian Football League).

References 

1955 births
Living people
Geelong Football Club players
Australian rules footballers from Victoria (Australia)